La Pêche Lake is a lake in Gatineau Park, Quebec, Canada. It lies in the northwest part of the municipality of Pontiac, in Les Collines-de-l'Outaouais Regional County Municipality.

See also
 Gatineau Park
 Wakefield, municipality
 Pontiac, municipality
 La Pêche River

External links

Lakes of Outaouais